Cannonball is the nickname of:

 Cannonball Adderley (1928–1975), American jazz alto saxophonist
 Erwin Baker (1882–1960), American motorcycle and automobile racing driver and organizer
 Harry Frederick Baker (1904–1986), Australian speedway motorcycle rider and aviator
 Jim Butler (American football) (1943–2014), American National Football League running back
 Paul Carter (darts player) (born 1974), English darts player
 Clyde Crabtree (1905–1994), American football player
 Ed Crane (baseball) (1862–1896), American Major League Baseball pitcher and outfielder
 Norman Curtis (1924–2009), English footballer
 Charlie Fleming (1927–1997), Scottish footballer
 Bill Jackman (1897–1972), American pitcher in baseball's Negro leagues
 Lawson Little (1910–1968), American golfer
 Cannon Ball Miller (fl. 1900–1906), baseball pitcher in the pre-Negro leagues
 Ed Morris (1880s pitcher) (1862–1937), American Major League Baseball pitcher
 Didier Pitre (1883–1934), Canadian ice hockey player
 Dick Redding (1890–1948), American pitcher, outfielder and manager in the Negro leagues
 Frank Richards (performer) (1887–1969), American vaudeville performer whose act involved being shot in the gut with a cannonball
 Ledell Titcomb (1866–1950), American Major League Baseball pitcher
 Gus Weyhing (1866–1955), American Major League Baseball pitcher

See also 
 
 
 Jackie Chan (born 1954), Hong Kong actor and martial artist nicknamed Pao-pao ("Cannonball")
 Dave Hickson (1929–2013), English footballer nicknamed "Cannonball Kid"
 John Maulbetsch (1890–1950), American college football player nicknamed "the Michigan Cannon Ball"

Lists of people by nickname